Lisa Hensley may refer to:

 Lisa Hensley (microbiologist), American microbiologist
 Lisa Hensley (actress), Australian actress